The 1888 Kansas gubernatorial election was held on November 6, 1888. Republican nominee Lyman U. Humphrey defeated Democratic nominee John Martin with 54.68% of the vote.

General election

Candidates
Major party candidates 
Lyman U. Humphrey, Republican
John Martin, Democratic

Other candidates
Peter Percival Elder, Union Labor
Jeremiah D. Botkin, Prohibition

Results

References

1888
Kansas
Gubernatorial